The Archaeological Museum of Agios Nikolaos is a museum in Agios Nikolaos, Crete, Greece.  It is currently closed for restoration (date of this edit is 13 October 2015).  No re-opening date is available.

Room 1
The largest collection, displaying items excavated at Agia Fotia cemetery near Sitia is housed in the first room. The room also contains many notable vases and several hundred bronze blades of differing shapes and level of sharpness also found in the graves of Agia Fotia. Fish hooks dating back to early Minoan Crete are also exhibited.

Gallery of photos from the years 2005 and 2010

References

External links
Hellenic Ministry of Culture and Tourism / in Greek
Crete Tournet

Agios Nikolaos
Museums established in 1970